The General Motors Ultralite was a 1992 low emission vehicle concept car intended to demonstrate the benefits of advanced materials and low fuel consumption.

The carbon fiber shell was fabricated by Scaled Composites and it weighed only 420 pounds (191 kg). The total weight of the car was 1,400 pounds (635 kg).

The car had gull-wing doors and no B-pillar. The drag coefficient, Cd, was 0.19, significantly lower than that of production cars of the decade.

Its three-cylinder 1.5 L two-stroke engine could produce 111 hp (83 kW), which made a speed of 135 mph (217 km/h) possible. The car could accelerate from 0 to 60 mph (97 km/h) in less than eight seconds.

The shape was reminiscent of the Ford Probe concept, and the Ultralite presaged the production General Motors EV1 electric vehicle and other production models.

In popular culture
Due to the unusual design, the Ultralite has been featured in several science fiction productions, most prominently among them was in the 1993 film Demolition Man as the squad cars used by the fictional SAPD (San Angeles Police Department). They also appeared in the second episode of the second season of seaQuest DSV, and in the 1999 movie Bicentennial Man.

References

Ultralite
Scaled Composites